The Political Warfare Bureau (GPWB) is the affiliated authority of the Ministry of National Defense (MND) of the Republic of China (Taiwan) that is responsible for all the political warfare affairs of the Republic of China Armed Forces.

History 
Since its establishment in 1924, the Whampoa Military Academy had already set up its political work system. In April 1950, the academy reformed the political work system by changing the Political Staff Bureau to Political Department. In May 1951, it was renamed General Political Department and in August 1963 as General Political Warfare Department with some modifications to its structural agencies. The department was led by deputy director Yi Kuo-juei. On 1 March 2002, the Organizational Ordinance of the General Political Warfare Bureau was put into performance.

In response to increasing Chinese Communist Party (CCP) political warfare campaigns on social media in the late 2010s the Political Warfare Bureau set up a team dedicated to the expeditious handling of false information. The Bureau uses big data system analysis in its efforts to understand and counter CCP disinformation campaigns in real time.

Organizational structure 
 General Administration Division (主計室)
 Office of Military Spokesperson (軍事新聞處)
 Military Dependents Service Division (軍眷服務處)
 Military Discipline & Ethics Division (政戰綜合處)
 Counter Intelligence & Security Division (保防安全處)
 Cultural & Political Division (文宣心戰處)

See also 
 People's Liberation Army General Political Department

References

External links 
 

Military installations of the Republic of China
2002 establishments in Taiwan
Government agencies established in 2002
Psychological operations units and formations
Taiwanese intelligence agencies